Ticonderoga, also called Ti or Big Ti, is a 72-foot (21.9 m) ketch, designed by L. Francis Herreshoff and launched in 1936 at Quincy Adams Yacht Yard in Massachusetts. She was know under the name of Tioga II until 1946.

History 
Ticonderoga won many races, finishing first in 24 of her initial 36 races. She held more than 30 course records in multiple races.

Races and Trophies 

 As Tioga, the Miami-Nassau Cup Race in 1940, for many years she held the fastest time in this race
 The Prince of Wales Bowl in 1947, first-to-finish, Class A, and over all trophy
 Marblehead-Halifax Race in 1947
 First-to-finish in the annual St. Petersburg-Habana yacht race in 1951, 1952, and 1954
 Transpac Honolulu Race Elapsed Time Record Trophy in 1965, setting the record that stood for ten years
 1965 Montego Bay Race.

During World War II she served as a U.S. Coast Guard vessel on submarine patrol. After the war she was bought by Allan Carliste and rechristened Ticonderoga.

Her racing career ended in 1967 when her hull was rebuilt and she was turned into a luxury charter in 1969.

Radiance is Ti's sistership.

See also 

 List of sailing boat types

References 

1930s sailboat type designs
Sailing yachts
Sailboat type designs by L. Francis Herreshoff